João Braz de Aviz (born 24 April 1947) is a prelate of the Roman Catholic Church. He has served as the prefect of the Congregation for Institutes of Consecrated Life and Societies of Apostolic Life since his appointment by Pope Benedict XVI in 2011. He began his career working for twenty years as a parish priest and seminary teacher. He became a bishop in 1994 and was bishop of Ponta Grossa from 1998 to 2002, archbishop of Maringá from 2002 to 2004, and archbishop of Brasília from 2004 to 2011.

Early life and education
Aviz was born in Mafra, Diocese of Joinville, Santa Catarina, Brazil in 1947. He has four brothers and three sisters – the youngest sister has Down's syndrome. After pursuing his philosophical studies at the Major Seminary Rainha dos Apostolos in Curitiba and the Faculty of Palmas, he completed his theological studies in Rome at the Pontifical Gregorian University, where he obtained a licenciate, and at the Pontifical Lateran University, where he graduated in 1992 with a doctorate in dogmatic theology.

Priesthood
Aviz was ordained a priest 26 November 1972. He began his ministry as a parish priest in the diocese of Apucarana, as Rector of the Major Seminary Apucarana and Londrina, and as professor of dogmatic theology at the Theological Institute Paul VI in Londrina. He was also member of the Council of Priests and the College of Consultors and General Coordinator of the Diocesan Pastoral Apucarana. As a young priest Aviz was once on his way to a village to say Mass when he stumbled upon an armored car robbery. He was caught in the crossfire and shot, with bullets perforating his lungs and intestines and one eye. He survived and surgeons were able to save his eye; he still carries fragments of those bullets in his body.

Episcopate
On 6 April 1994, he was appointed to the titular bishop of Flenucleta as auxiliary of the Archdiocese of Vitória and received episcopal consecration on 31 May of that year. He was appointed bishop of the Roman Catholic Diocese of Ponta Grossa on 12 August 1998 by Pope John Paul II. He was promoted to archbishop of Maringá on 17 July 2002 where he served until he was appointed archbishop of Brasília on 28 January 2004. In May 2010 he organised the XVI National Eucharistic Congress, which coincided with the 50th anniversary of the city's founding.

Roman curia
On 4 January 2011, Aviz, not a member of a religious order, was appointed prefect of the Congregation for Institutes of Consecrated Life and Societies of Apostolic Life. He is the fourth Brazilian to head a Vatican department.

In February 2011, Aviz said he almost abandoned the seminary and the Catholic Church because of the ideological excesses that emerged in the early years of liberation theology. He said in an interview that "Personally, I lived with a lot of anguish during the years of the birth of liberation theology". He said he appreciated that liberation theology promoted the preferential option for the poor, which represents "the church's sincere and responsible concern for the vast phenomenon of social exclusion." He said consecrated men and women need to explore more deeply the mystery of God to strengthen their relationships with others.

In July 2011, he referred to a breakdown in trust between the Vatican and many religious orders because of "some positions taken previously", referring to his predecessor, Cardinal Franc Rode, who decried a "crisis" in religious life following the Second Vatican Council (1962–65) which he believed to have fostered excessively liberalizing currents in some communities of religious. Braz said that he recognizes there are problems, but his main aim is to "rebuild trust" by approaching issues in a new way, "without preemptive condemnations" and "by listening to people's concerns."

In his memoirs, published in 2022, Cardinal Rode recounts his astonishment at hearing of the appointment of Braz as his successor. The first to inform him of Braz was Pietro Sambi, Apostolic Nuncio to the United States. He described Braz as "un fanatico focolarino" ("a fanatic focolarino", a member of the Focolare Movement). According to Rode, the fact that a female secretary of Tarcisio Bertone, Cardinal Secretary of State, was also a fervent member of the Focolare Movement contributed to the appointment of Braz.

Pope Benedict made him a cardinal on 18 February 2012, with the rank of Cardinal-Deacon assigned to Sant'Elena fuori Porta Prenestina. On 21 April 2012 he was appointed a member of the Congregation for the Clergy and the Congregation for Catholic Education. In the spring of 2013, at the time of the conclave that elected Pope Francis, he was mentioned as a possible candidate for election to the papacy.

On 16 December 2013, Pope Francis named him a member of the Congregation for Bishops.

On 4 March 2022, he was elevated to the rank of cardinal priest.

Notes

References

External links

 

|-

1947 births
Living people
Brazilian cardinals
Pontifical Gregorian University alumni
Pontifical Lateran University alumni
21st-century Roman Catholic archbishops in Brazil
Members of the Congregation for Institutes of Consecrated Life and Societies of Apostolic Life
Cardinals created by Pope Benedict XVI
Members of the Congregation for Catholic Education
Members of the Congregation for the Clergy
Members of the Congregation for Bishops
Roman Catholic archbishops of Brasília
Roman Catholic archbishops of Maringá
Roman Catholic bishops of Vitória
Roman Catholic bishops of Ponta Grossa